This is a list of now defunct airlines from Republic of Nauru.

See also
 List of airlines of Nauru
 List of airports in Nauru

References

Airlines
Nauru